Typha albida is a plant species endemic to Afghanistan. It grows in freshwater marshes.

References

albida
Freshwater plants
Endemic flora of Afghanistan
Plants described in 1970